The women's balance beam gymnastic event at the 2019 Pan American Games was held on July 31 at the Polideportivo Villa el Salvador.

Schedule
All times are Eastern Standard Time (UTC-3).

Results

Final

Qualification

References

Gymnastics at the 2019 Pan American Games
Pan American Games 2019